Muḥammad ibn ʿAbd Allāh ibn al-Ḥasan al-Muthannā ibn al-Ḥasan al-Mujtabā ibn ʿAlī ibn Abī Ṭālib or Muḥammad al-Nafs al-Zakīyya, was a descendant of the Islamic prophet Muhammad, through his daughter Fatimah.  Known for his commanding oratory skills, amiable demeanor, and impressive build, he led the Alid Revolt in Medina, a failed rebellion, against the second Abbasid caliph Al-Mansur. He and a few hundred soldiers faced against a large Abbasid force under Isa ibn Musa, and he was killed on December 6, 762 CE (145 AH).

Life
Initially, he hoped to rebel against Umayyad rule, when the children of Hashim paid their allegiance to him at Abwa. Among them were Ibrahim al-Imam, As-Saffah and Al-Mansur. But it soon became clear that Abbasid rule was established, so those who had paid allegiance to him deserted him, and another group of Shiites flocked around him.

Personality
Muhammad was an inspirational figure to many throughout the caliphate who believed that he was destined for glory due to his ancestry. For years he disguised himself and travelled stealthily, since his professed relationship to the Prophet meant that he posed a threat to the established political order.  He was eventually able to amass a sizable but ragtag army and seize the city of Medina. He then left Medina in the year 145 A.H and took over Mecca and Yemen. He was murdered in Medina a few months later.

Revolt in 762–763 
Medina was an exceptionally poor place for any large-scale insurrection due to its dependence on other provinces for goods, and his motley army of devotees were no match for the Caliph's imperial soldiers.  Despite the advantage held by the Abbasid troops, Muhammad refused to step down in the hours before battle, utilizing the historic trenches dug by the Prophet to fortify the city decades earlier.

Ancestry

See also
Abbasids
Alids
Abdullah Shah Ghazi, son of Muhammad
Ja'far al-Sadiq
Nafs-e-Zakiyyah (Pure soul)
Zaydism

References

Year of birth missing
762 deaths
8th-century Arabs
Hasanids
8th-century people from the Abbasid Caliphate